Fred Waite (1853–1895) was an American cowboy. 

Fred Waite may also refer to:

 Fred Waite (American football), American football coach
 Fred Waite (politician) (1885–1952), New Zealand soldier and later politician of the Reform Party